Cristina "Tina" Bes (i) Ginesta  (born 21 March 1977) is a Catalan ski mountaineer.

Bes was born in Girona. She started ski mountaineering in 1999 and competed first in the same year. In 2000, she became a member of the national team. Her brother Jordi is also a competition ski mountaineer.

Selected results 
 2001:
 9th, European Championship team race (together with Eulàlia "Lali" Gendrau Gallifa)
 2002:
 2nd, Spanish Championship team (together with Gemma Furió Francisco)
 3rd, Spanish Championship
 4th, Spanish Cup
 2003:
 1st, Spanish Championship team (together with Iolanda García Sàez)
 2nd, Spanish Championship team single
 3rd, Spanish Cup
 4th, European Cup team (together with Iolanda García Sàez)
 9th, European Championship team race (together with Iolanda García Sàez)
 2004:
 2nd, Spanish Championship team single
 3rd, Open Internacional, San Carlos de Bariloche
 5th, World Championship relay race (together with Emma Roca Rodríguez and Iolanda García Sàez)
 10th, World Championship (together with Emma Roca Rodríguez)
 2005:
 1st, Spanish Championship team single
 1st, Spanish Championship team (together with Emma Roca Rodríguez)
 2nd, Spanish Championship vertical race
 5th, Spanish Cup
 5th, European Championship team race (together with Emma Roca Rodríguez)
 5th, European Championship relay race (together with Emma Roca Rodríguez and Sara Gros Aspiroz)
 7th, World Cup race, Salt Lake City
 8th, World Cup team (together with Emma Roca Rodríguez)
 2006:
 1st, Spanish Championship team single
 2nd, Spanish Championship vertical race
 5th, World Championship relay race (together with Gemma Arró Ribot, Naila Jornet Burgada and Izaskun Zubizarreta)
 9th, World Championship team race (together with Izaskun Zubizarreta Guerendiain)
 2008:
 5th, World Championship relay race (together with Gemma Arró Ribot, Izaskun Zubizarreta Guerendiain and Emma Roca Rodríguez)
 7th (and 5th in the "civilian international women" ranking), Patrouille des Glaciers (together with Emma Roca Rodríguez and Izaskun Zubizarreta Guerendiain)
 2010:
 4th, World Championship relay race (together with Mireia Miró Varela and Gemma Arró Ribot)
 2011:
 3rd, World Championship relay (together with Gemma Arró Ribot and Mireia Miró Varela)
 7th, World Championship team race (together with Izaskun Zubizarreta Guerendiain)

Pierra Menta 

 2002: 5th, together with Emma Roca Rodríguez
 2008: 6th, together with Emma Roca Rodríguez
 2010: 5th, together with Patricia Althape-Arhondo

References

External links 
 Cristina Bes at skimountaineering.org
 Cristina Bes Ginesta, website of the FEDME
 see also Cristina 'Tina' Bes

1977 births
Living people
Ski mountaineers from Catalonia
Sportspeople from Girona
Spanish female ski mountaineers